Rutana is a town in Burundi.

Rutana may also refer to:
Rutana Province, a province of Burundi,
Rutana (languages), a term for non-Arabic languages spoken in Sudan